David Cleto Fumanelli (21 April 1992, Milan) is an Italian racing driver and racing coach.

Single Seater Career

Formula Renault 2.0
Fumanelli, after just two years of national karting races, made his single-seater debut in 2008 in his native Italian Formula Renault 2.0 series, driving for RP Motorsport.

Formula 3
In September 2008, Fumanelli made his Formula 3 debut in the Spanish Formula 3 series, competing for last 2 rounds of the championship. During the last event in Valencia he was involved in a violent airborne accident with Spanish driver Carmen Jordá, which resulted in a vertebra trauma which forced him to a 6 months stop.

Fumanelli remained in the series for 2009, the first of three full seasons in the category with RP Motorsport. He finished his first full-season in eighth place and "Best Rookie" after recording two late-season victories at Jerez and Barcelona.

In 2010, he took three race wins to finish the year 3rd overall, showing an impressive progression and speed.

In 2011 Fumanelli finished as F3 European Open Vice - Champion. After a slow start to the season, which saw just one podium finish in the first eight races, he took four race victories in the final eight races, to finish eight points behind the Swiss driver Alex Fontana.

GP3 Series
Following a successful test at Jerez in December 2011, Fumanelli graduated to the GP3 Series in 2012, racing for MW Arden Team.

His rookie season was very strong, many top-5 qualifyings brought him to a podium finish at the European GP in Valencia Street Circuit and a 4th place in Monaco Gran Prix.

He was forced to miss the Silverstone round due to family matters and he finished the season 11th overall in the championship.

In 2013 he continued in the series with the Italian Team Trident Racing. Despite some very strong winter tests, the Italian duo struggled with performance during the season and they decided to split up one round to the end of the championship.

Best result of the season was in the first round at the Spanish Gran Prix with a 7th place. He finished the season 19th overall.

GT career

Blancpain GT Series
In 2014 Fumanelli switched to GT racing and made his debut in the Blancpain GT Sprint Series with Roal Motorsport with a BMW Z4 GT3, sharing the box with the great Alex Zanardi. He finished the season as Silver Cup Vice-Champion with his mate Stefano Colombo.

In 2016 he was called to compete in the 24 Hours of Spa-Francorchamps by Scuderia Praha with the new Ferrari 488 GT3.

In 2017 Fumanelli was selected by McLaren GT as Junior Driver to race for the factory team Strakka Racing with a McLaren 650S GT3. He competed in the Endurance series, plus some spot races in the Sprint Series alongside Lewis Williamson.

He was forced to leave McLaren at the end of the year due to a company restructuring.

Strakka Racing decided to keep Fumanelli for his 2018 campaign, where they switched from McLaren to Mercedes AMG. They debuted together at Bathurst 12 hours, first round of the Intercontinental GT Challenge with a Mercedes AMG GT3 finishing 3rd in Pro Am class. He was involved in both Intercontinental GT Challenge and Blancpain GT Endurance races, where he was selected to race in the Mercedes AMG factory car for the Silverstone round, alongside the two german aces Max Buhk and Maximilian Goetz.

The highlights of the year, together with Bathurst podium, were the 2nd place in Pro Am class at the 24 hours of Spa-Francorchamps and 1st place in Pro Am in the California 8 hours, Laguna Seca.

In 2019 he did two races for Strakka Racing, finishing 3rd in Pro Am at the 24 hours of Spa-Francorchamps alongside Christina Nielsen, Richard Heidstand and Jack Hawksworth.

He raced for Mercedes Black Falcon Team in the last round of Blancpain GT Endurance, finishing 2nd in Silver class and 7th overall.

Ferrari Challenge Europe
In 2017 Fumanelli won the Ferrari Master Show race during Bologna Motor Show, with a Ferrari 488 Challenge with Rossocorsa Racing.

In 2018 he did three races in Ferrari Challenge Europe with Rossocorsa Racing, finishing second in the World Finals at Monza.

Renault Sport Trophy

Between 2015 and 2016 Fumanelli competed for Oregon Team in the Renault Sport Trophy, a one-make sports-car series made by Renault Sport.

He won the Endurance title in 2015 with his team mate Dario Capitanio and finished 3rd in Pro class standings.

Racing record

Career summary

Complete GP3 Series results
(key) (Races in bold indicate pole position) (Races in italics indicate fastest lap)

Complete Blancpain Sprint Series results
(key) (Races in bold indicate pole position) (Races in italics indicate fastest lap)

References

External links
Official website 
 Career details from Driver Database
 

1992 births
Living people
Racing drivers from Milan
Italian Formula Renault 2.0 drivers
Italian Formula Three Championship drivers
Euroformula Open Championship drivers
Italian GP3 Series drivers
Arden International drivers
Blancpain Endurance Series drivers
Asian Le Mans Series drivers
International GT Open drivers
RP Motorsport drivers
Strakka Racing drivers
Trident Racing drivers
Mercedes-AMG Motorsport drivers
McLaren Racing drivers
24H Series drivers
Le Mans Cup drivers
Ferrari Challenge drivers